Lingen is a surname. It may refer to:

Clifford Lingen (1881–1907), English golfer
Henry Lingen (1612–1662), Royalist military commander during the English Civil War and member of parliament
Marissa Lingen (born 1978), American short fiction writer 
Ralph Lingen, 1st Baron Lingen (1819–1905), English civil servant
Theo Lingen (1903–1978), German actor, film director and screenwriter
Ursula Lingen (1928–2014), German-Austrian actress
Michael van Lingen (born 1997), Namibian cricketer
Kerstin von Lingen (born 1971), German military historian